Fatehabad is a town and a village in Madhya Pradesh
It is also a railway junction.

A cenotaph of maharaja Ratan Singh of Ratlam was made here. He died fighting against Aurangzeb.

References

Cities and towns in Madhya Pradesh